Mandhal is a major commercial town in Kuhi  Taluka of Nagpur district.  Mandhal is famous for Chilly production and is a major market attracting traders from across the state and the state of Madhya Pradesh, Telangana and Chhattisgarh. The Agricultural produce market committee (APMC) of Mandhal is one of the largest in the district (https://web.archive.org/web/20090410004745/http://agmarknet.nic.in/profile/profile_online/displayformdetails.asp?mkt=2116 ) that serves to  186 towns and villages in the Kuhi Taluka.

The historical name for Mandhal was Matangnagari. It is famous for Akhada i.e indian wrestling. Competitions are held each year for the pandav panchami of Diwali festival at Bhola hudki.

Nearby towns 

Mandhal has direct connectivity with all nearby towns and cities. There is frequent bus service by Maharashtra State Road Transport Corporation (MSRTC) from the district head quarter Nagpur(55 km). It is connected with sub divisional head quarter Umred and taluka place Kuhi by all weather pucca road .

Route map for Mandhal 

Weather of Mandhal 

References

Cities and towns in Nagpur district